Hintersee is a municipality in the district of Salzburg-Umgebung in the state of Salzburg in Austria.

Geography
The municipality lies in the Flachgau on the Tauglbach (Lämmerbach).

References

Cities and towns in Salzburg-Umgebung District